Fakhel is a village development committee in Makwanpur District in the Narayani Zone of southern Nepal. At the time of the 2011 Nepal census it had a population of 4,524 people living in 1,011 individual households.

Mostly populated by the people of Tamang community. Tamang is a tribal community of Nepal mostly living in Himalayan and mountain regions like Dhading, Kavre

References

Populated places in Makwanpur District